Chezhina Svetlana (Russian: Чежина Светлана Игоревна), born January 12, 1985, is a comic book artist from Kazakhstan. She works under the Japanese pseudonym Midorikawa Tsuyoshi (Japanese: 緑川毅志) that can be translated as "Green River, a strong soul (heart)", despite the chosen given name being a masculine name.

Biography 
Svetlana was born in 1985 in the town of Rudniy, Kostanai Province, Republic of Kazakhstan.

In the 14 years to continue the study moved to Russia, in a small Ural town Korkino. And in the first year of life in Russia she became interested in Japanese animation.

In 2000, Svetlana entered the Chelyabinsk Art College at a special «Decorative and applied arts and folk crafts» specialized «Art ceramics.»
Protecting a diploma with honors, in 2004 the artist has finished training.

And in 2002 she had the idea to go to university, specializing in «artist-animator anime.»

Contact with the famous Japanese artist Naoko Takeuchi-author stories Bishōjo Senshi (Sailor Moon), Svetlana learned about the manga. And on the advice Takeuchi-sensei tried themselves in art comics. Then she took seriously the creation of comic stories.

In 2005, the press got her first comic Dream \ Yume . The project was an important stepping stone in the works of the author. Through plot comics she tried to understand themselves and express their own outlook. It was after this work Tsuyoshi received public recognition.

Currently lives in Tokyo, Japan.

Works 
Comics

 The name: Dream
 
Genre: Shōjo\Shōnen.
Adventures with elements of fantasy and mysticism.

 The name: Portrait

Genre: a psychological drama.

Illustrations

 The Hidden  Tokyopop (story by Barbara Lien-Cooper and Park Cooper)
 Firefly [ホタル]  Chris Lawrence

Awards 

 "The Best Poster 2003", the magazine "Gen-13" (Rovesnik publisher, Moscow);
Cover the fan-zine “Poppuri Anime”, October, 2004 Project “Wings of a dragonfly”, a character Ogata Nomu (founder Ltd." Maya ", Kirov);
"The best manga 2005" magazine "Gen-13", Draft manga "Dream \ Yume" (Rovesnik publisher, Moscow);
Participant-Moscow international festival to draw stories "KomMissia2006". Draft manga "Dream \ Yume", among the other participants, took a part of the exhibition in the art-gallery "M'Ars", Moscow;
1 Place in the competition drawings magazine "Anime Guide", July 2007. The "Крылья стрекозы \ Wings of a dragonfly" (publisher and founder Ltd. "Anime Guide", Moscow).
In September 2008 in Tokyo, Japan, Chezhina Svetlana won silver award at The 2nd International Manga Award for her manga "Portrait".

References

External links 
Midorikawa Tsuyoshi site::: (Official site)
Blog [removed]
Gallery

1985 births
Living people
Kazakhstani comics artists
Kazakhstani female comics artists
Women manga artists